Precious Collection 1995–2002 is a singles collection released by Japanese dance unit, MAX. It was released on March 20, 2002 on the avex trax label. The album compiled all of the group's first 23 singles on a two disc set. Due to lead vocalist Mina's pending hiatus because of pregnancy, the album replaced their original fifth studio album that was set for release at the time. First pressing of the album include a bonus track, "Spring Rain (M.H.JS Mix)" and a commemorative photo booklet.

Track list

 Disc 1

 Koi Suru Velfarre Dance: Saturday Night (恋するヴェルファーレダンス 〜Saturday Night〜)  
 Kiss Me Kiss Me, Baby
 TORA TORA TORA
 Seventies
 GET MY LOVE!
 Give Me a Shake
 Love Is Dreaming
 Shinin'on-Shinin'love
 Hikari no Veil (閃光 -ひかり- のVEIL; Veil of Light) 
 Ride On Time
 Grace of My Heart
 Love Impact

 Disc 2

 Ano Natsu e to (あの夏へと; And to That Summer) 
 Ginga no Chikai (銀河の誓い; Vow of the Milky Way) 
 Issho ni... (一緒に・・・; Together)
 Never Gonna Stop It
 MAGIC
 Barairo no Hibi (バラ色の日々; The Rose Colored Days) 
 always love
 Perfect Love
 Moonlight
 Feel So Right
 Spring Rain
 Spring Rain (M.H.JS MIX)

MAX (band) albums
2002 compilation albums
Avex Group compilation albums
Albums produced by Max Martin